Security Building may refer to:

 Security Building (Phoenix, Arizona), listed on the National Register of Historic Places (NRHP)
 Security Building (Los Angeles, California)
 Security Building (Miami, Florida), NRHP-listed
 Security Building (Cedar Rapids, Iowa), NRHP-listed
 Security Building (Dubuque, Iowa), NRHP-listed
 Security Building (St. Louis, Missouri), NRHP-listed
 Security Building (Dunedin), Heritage New Zealand-listed

See also
Fireproof Building, Charleston, South Carolina, NRHP-listed